Anton Terekhov (born 28 July 1992) is a Ukrainian handball player for  CS Minaur Baia Mare and the Ukrainian national team.

He represented Ukraine at the 2020 European Men's Handball Championship.

References

External links

1992 births
Living people
Ukrainian male handball players
Expatriate handball players in Poland
Ukrainian expatriate sportspeople in Estonia
Ukrainian expatriate sportspeople in Poland
HC Motor Zaporizhia players
21st-century Ukrainian people